Paracoccus is a genus of true bugs belonging to the family Pseudococcidae.

The genus has cosmopolitan distribution.

Species:

Paracoccus abnormalis 
Paracoccus acaenae 
Paracoccus aestuariivivens 
Paracoccus alazanensis 
Paracoccus albatus 
Paracoccus alcaliphilus 
Paracoccus alkenifer 
Paracoccus aminovorans 
Paracoccus angustae 
Paracoccus ascius 
Paracoccus aspratilis 
Paracoccus baccharidicola 
Paracoccus bengalensis 
Paracoccus biporus 
Paracoccus boumaensis
Paracoccus bruguierae 
Paracoccus burnerae 
Paracoccus busiaensis 
Paracoccus butcherae 
Paracoccus caeni 
Paracoccus canalis 
Paracoccus cavaticus 
Paracoccus circuliprivis 
Paracoccus claudus 
Paracoccus contaminans 
Paracoccus coriariae 
Paracoccus cryptus 
Paracoccus deboerae 
Paracoccus deceptus 
Paracoccus decorus 
Paracoccus definitus 
Paracoccus dendricola 
Paracoccus diversus 
Paracoccus drimydis 
Paracoccus eastopi 
Paracoccus erigeroni 
Paracoccus ferrisi 
Paracoccus gillianae
Paracoccus glaucus 
Paracoccus hakeae
Paracoccus hamoni 
Paracoccus hebes 
Paracoccus herreni 
Paracoccus huijuniae 
Paracoccus ilu 
Paracoccus insolitus 
Paracoccus interceptus 
Paracoccus juniperi 
Paracoccus kajiadoensis 
Paracoccus laeviglucosivorans 
Paracoccus larinus 
Paracoccus latebrosus 
Paracoccus leptospermi 
Paracoccus leucadendri
Paracoccus limuricus 
Paracoccus longicauda 
Paracoccus lycopersici 
Paracoccus marcusii 
Paracoccus marginatus 
Paracoccus melanesicus 
Paracoccus methylutens 
Paracoccus mexicanus 
Paracoccus miro 
Paracoccus morobensis 
Paracoccus multiductus 
Paracoccus muraltiae 
Paracoccus mutabilis 
Paracoccus myrtacearum 
Paracoccus nellorensis 
Paracoccus neocarens 
Paracoccus niuensis 
Paracoccus nothofagi 
Paracoccus nothofagicola 
Paracoccus oneratus 
Paracoccus ordinis 
Paracoccus orsomi 
Paracoccus parvicirculus 
Paracoccus perperus 
Paracoccus pinguis 
Paracoccus poculiporus 
Paracoccus podocarpi 
Paracoccus ranavalonae 
Paracoccus redactus 
Paracoccus reductus 
Paracoccus salviacola 
Paracoccus solani 
Paracoccus spinulosus 
Paracoccus sporoboli 
Paracoccus tectus 
Paracoccus townsendi 
Paracoccus trichinus 
Paracoccus trichospermi 
Paracoccus tuaregensis 
Paracoccus turrialbensis 
Paracoccus villanuevai 
Paracoccus zealandicus

References

Pseudococcidae